Torit Mitra  (born 4 September 1956) is a noted Indian Bengali playwright and theatre director.  He co-founded avant-garde theatre company, Sansaptak in 1992 . He has written 80 plays, all staged by Sansaptak. After completing his graduation acquiring first class first position in Bachelor of Fine Arts in 1979 from Delhi College of Arts and receiving UNICEF Fellowship for Fine Arts, Torit Mitra started practicing painting professionally and became famous for his black and white drawings with political overtones, receiving many national and international awards, recognitions and found their way to national and international collections and archives. He was also aligned with the literary movement of the time.

Initially he started working in Bengali amateur theatre groups as set designer and actor. Though at the age of 21 he became the youngest playwright and director of Bangla to receive an award in Delhi’s theatre arena, he was unhappy and dissatisfied by the practices in the Urban Bengali Theatre in Delhi.

It was 1992, when some of his theatre friends approached him, with zealous motivation, to build a group of their own. They all had a common goal, a new outlook to art of theatre, a new language, which would be their own. Eventually, a group for theatre was born and was named ‘SANSAPTAK’ which became the turning point for Delhi’s Bengali Theatre, as it was solely formed for the purpose of theatre.

Since 1982 to the present times, Torit Mitra has penned 34 plays; all staged under his Direction and Design, by SANSAPTAK and other groups. All his plays have been critically acclaimed and loved by audiences.

He has received Best Playwright and Best Director awards for several of his plays at national competitions and felicitated several times by receiving the Gunijon Sambardhana (Eminent Citizen Honor) for being the only prolific contemporary writer and director in Delhi for promoting progressive developments in Bangla Language, through his stories, poetry and contemporary plays by Chittaranjan Park Bangiya Samaj (Delhi), Chittaranjan Park Community (Delhi), Bangiya Samaj Karol Bagh (Delhi) and Aneek Theatre Group (Kolkata). His plays have been performed under his design and direction at international and national theatre festivals like Bharat Rang Mahotsav, Legends of India, International Ganga-Jamuna Festival, All India Short Play Festival, Delhi International Arts Festival, Bharatendu Natya Utsav, etc.

Three of his original Bengali plays have been published and a publication consisting four of his Hindi plays translated from his original Bengali plays is in process. Apart from plays, he has penned innumerable short stories, poems and articles, published and unpublished. A collection of his 14 best short stories has been recently published entitled ‘Abba Othoba Ekti Nidoya Shonsharer Galpo’ creating ripples in the Bengali community.

References

Indian male dramatists and playwrights
1956 births
Living people
Bengali-language writers
Bengali theatre personalities
Indian theatre directors